Midway Mountain is a remote  mountain summit located on the Great Western Divide of the Sierra Nevada mountain range, in Tulare County of northern California. Midway Mountain ranks as the 39th-highest summit in California, and the highest point on the central Great Western Divide. It would be the highest of the entire Great Western Divide if the Kaweah Peaks were excluded.

History
This mountain was originally named "Mount Michaelis" in 1881 to honor Captain Otho Ernest Michaelis (1843–1890), US Army. Michaelis was the first white man to discover the body of General Custer following the Battle of the Little Bighorn. The Mt. Whitney USGS 30' maps published in 1905 and 1937 show this geographical feature without any name, although Milestone and Table Mountains were marked as such.

The first ascent of the summit was made in 1912 by Francis P. Farquhar, William Edward Colby, and Robert M. Price. This same trio of Sierra Club pioneers also made the first ascent of nearby Milestone Mountain on July 14, 1912. Midway's south face was first climbed in 1987 by Mark Hoffman and Robin Ingraham, Jr.

Climate
Midway Mountain is located in an alpine climate zone. Most weather fronts originate in the Pacific Ocean, and travel east toward the Sierra Nevada mountains. As fronts approach, they are forced upward by the peaks, causing them to drop their moisture in the form of rain or snowfall onto the range (orographic lift). Precipitation runoff from the east side of the mountain drains to Kern River via Milestone Creek, and west to the Roaring River.

See also

 List of mountain peaks of California

References

External links
 Weather forecast: Midway Mountain
 Flickr photo

Mountains of Tulare County, California
Mountains of Kings Canyon National Park
Mountains of Sequoia National Park
North American 4000 m summits
Mountains of Northern California
Sierra Nevada (United States)